The 2002 Salt Lake County Council election was held on Tuesday, November 2, 2004, to elect 4 of the 9 members of the Salt Lake County Council (1 at-large and 3 districts).

Democrats captured one at-large seat, thus gaining one more seat and putting them in control of all three countywide at-large seats. Jenny Wilson became the first woman elected to the council since its foundation in 2000 (though at least one woman (Republican Mary Callaghan, elected 1998) had previously served on the county commission, that the council replaced in 2000.)

Election results 

The Salt Lake County council consists of nine seats: three alphabetical districts are at-large and elected to six-year terms, while six numerical districts are sectioned into separate districts and elected to four year terms.

At-large seat B

District 2

District 4

District 6

References

2004 Utah elections
2004 United States local elections
2004 in Utah
2000s in Salt Lake City